Jeff Dean is a punk rock musician and recording engineer based in Chicago, Illinois. He is best known for playing guitar in The Bomb with Jeff Pezzati of Naked Raygun, and Noise By Numbers with Dan Vapid of The Methadones. He currently plays in Deep Tunnel Project.

In addition to these bands, he is lead guitarist for All Eyes West, Explode and Make Up, and Dead Ending. Dean has also played in Tomorrows Gone, Cleon's Down, Yesterday's Heroes, Zero in Trust, The Story So Far, Four Star Alarm and Certain People I Know. Additional bands he has played, toured, and written with include Faded Grey, Textbook, Horace Pinker, Pink Avalanche and Schizoid. He is a recording engineer at Million Yen Studio in Chicago, IL.

Tomorrows Gone
Jeff Dean got his start in music with Las Vegas-based hardcore band Tomorrows Gone in 1994, joining the group early on in their existence after their original guitarist left the band to play metal. Dean played guitar on all of Tomorrows Gone's releases and temporarily played bass for the band's live shows in 1995. In 1996, Dean moved from Las Vegas to Detroit, while Tomorrows Gone vocalist Lance Wells moved to California. Despite the distance, Dean remained with the band until their breakup in 1997.

The Bomb
The Bomb was formed in 1999 by Jeff Pezzati of Naked Raygun. Producer Steve Albini (Shellac, Big Black) recorded their first two records, 'Arming' and 'Torch Songs'. Current members include Jeff Dean, Sensitive Pete (The Methadones, Naked Raygun) and Mike Soucy (The Methadones, Dan Vapid and the Cheats).

Noise By Numbers
Noise By Numbers started in 2008 with Dan Vapid (vocals, guitar), Jeff Dean (guitar), Rick Uncapher (bass) and Neil Hennessy (drums).  Hennessy left after the first album and was replaced by Jimmy Lucido. A second album was released August 2011.

Dead Ending
Formed in Chicago in 2012, Dead Ending is a super group of Chicago-based punk rock musicians Joe Principe (Rise Against) on bass, Derek Grant (Alkaline Trio) on drums, Vic Bondi (Articles of Faith) on vocals and Jeff Dean on guitar.

All Eyes West
A post punk rock band from Chicago featuring Justin Miller on Bass and Jon Drew on drums with Jeff Dean on guitar.

Discography

Tomorrows Gone 1993-1997

 S/T 7” – Element Records

Compilations:

 My Parents Went To Las Vegas And All They Bought Me Was This Fucking 7” – Bucky Records
 Making Human Junk – Hybrid Records
 In Words of One Syllable – Catchphraze Records

Collections:

 No Way to Make Time Stand Still 1993-1997 – World On Fire Records
 This Music Will Survive (The Complete Recordings) – Underground Communique Records

Yesterdays Heroes 1994-1995 

 No Guts, No Glory (CD) – Spartan Records

Compilations:

 Backstreets of American Oi! – Sta Press Records

Cleons Down 1995-1997 

 S/T 7” – Ulitarian Records

Compilations:

 The Big Fix – Allied Recordings
 The Michigan Compilation – Enerject Records
 Blood, Sweat, and Tears – General Records

Collections:

 I’ve Got a Plan – World On Fire Records

Zero In Trust 1997-1998 
Compilations:

 Blood, Sweat, and Tears – General Records
 Reveal the Character – Elkion Records

The Story So Far 1999 – 2002 

 When Fortune Smiled (CD) – Hopeless Records

Compilations:

 Disarming Violence – Fast Music
 Hopeless 50 – Hopeless Records
 The World I Know (A Tribute To Pegboy) – Underground Communique Records

The Bomb 2002 – 2014 

 Indecision (LP) – Thick/No Idea Records
 Speed is Everything (LP) – No Idea Records
 The Challenger (LP) – No Idea Records
 Axis of Awesome (EP) – No Idea Records

Compilations:

 Mean it Man – Thick Records
 Hair! – Thick Records

Four Star Alarm 2006-2008 

 S/T (CD) – Thick Records
 Tilted 7” – Underground Communique
 The Siren Sound (CD) – Solidarity Recordings

Compilations:

 Life After SUGAR Tribute – LAS:T Recordings
 Poison The World 3 – Poison City Records
 Hours and Hours: A Tribute to SEAWEED – Engineer Recordings

Explode And Make Up 2006 – 2014 

 S/T (LP) – Underground Communique
 Hellmouth split 7” – Underground Communique

Compilations:

 Hair! – Thick Records

Certain People I Know 2009-2010 

 S/T (LP) – Count Your Luck Stars Records

Noise By Numbers 2009 – 2012 

 Yeah Whatever (LP) – Asian Man Records
 Over Leavitt (LP) – Jump Start Records
 High on Drama (EP) – Jump Start Records
 So Quickly 7” – Art of the Underground Records
 Cheap Girls split 7” – Suburban Home Records
 The Magnificent split 7” – Solidarity Recording

All Eyes West 2010 – PRESENT 

 S/T (LP) – Jump Start Records
 Doomer (LP) – Jump Start Records
 With Wade (EP) – Underground Communique
 Break Anchor split 7” – Sideone Dummy Records
 Above Them split 7” – Jump Start Records
 Easy Creatures split 7” – Jump Start Records
 Like Lightning (LP) – Jump Start Records

Dead Ending 2012 – PRESENT 

 DE 1 (EP) – Alternative Tentacles Records
 DE 2 (EP) – Alternative Tentacles Records
 DE 3 (EP) – Bridge 9 Records
 Class War 7” – Alternative Tentacles Records
 Shoot The Messenger (LP) – Alternative Tentacles Records
 What you believe/Pain Killer 7” – Alternative Tentacles Records

Tight Night 2012 – PRESENT 

 Volume (LP) – Little Rocket Records

Moral Mazes 2014 - PRESENT 

 Magic Tommy Jackson 7” – Bridge 9 Records

Airstream Futures 2016 – PRESENT 

 Great Britain (tour EP)
 Spirale Infernale (LP) - Paper and Plastick Records
 En Avoir Marre (EP)
 IF I/PR Nightmares 7”– Little Rocket Records
 Le Feu et Le Sable (LP) – Little Rocket Records

Compilations:

 Volume One – Serial Bowl Records
 Launch 17 – Little Rocket Records
 Volume 3 – Hell Hath No Fury Records
 The First Five Years – Scary Clown Presents

References

Year of birth missing (living people)
Living people
American rock bass guitarists
American rock singers
American male bass guitarists
Noise by Numbers members
The Bomb (band) members